Sosnówka may refer to:

Sosnówka (lake), a reservoir in Jelenia Góra County, Lower Silesian Voivodeship, Poland

Settlements
Sosnówka, Biała Podlaska County in Lublin Voivodeship (east Poland)
Sosnówka, Jelenia Góra County in Lower Silesian Voivodeship (south-west Poland)
Sosnówka, Oleśnica County in Lower Silesian Voivodeship (south-west Poland)
Sosnówka, Kuyavian-Pomeranian Voivodeship (north-central Poland)
Sosnówka, Biała Podlaska County in Lublin Voivodeship (east Poland)
Sosnówka, Lubartów County in Lublin Voivodeship (east Poland)
Sosnówka, Ryki County in Lublin Voivodeship (east Poland)
Sosnówka, Lubusz Voivodeship (west Poland)
Sosnówka, Opole Voivodeship (south-west Poland)
Sosnówka, Podlaskie Voivodeship (north-east Poland)
Sosnówka, Świętokrzyskie Voivodeship (south-central Poland)
Sosnówka, Wąbrzeźno County in Kuyavian-Pomeranian Voivodeship (north-central Poland)
Sosnówka, West Pomeranian Voivodeship (north-west Poland)
Sosnówka, Masovian Voivodeship (east-central Poland)

See also
Sosnovka, several inhabited localities in Russia
Sosnivka, a city in Lviv Oblast, Ukraine